Stonington Township is one of seventeen townships in Christian County, Illinois, USA.  As of the 2020 census, its population was 993 and it contained 467 housing units.

Geography

Cities, towns, villages
 Stonington

Unincorporated towns
 Midway at 
 Sandersville at

Cemeteries
The township contains these three cemeteries: Mount Zion, Old Stonington and Ponting.

Major highways
  Illinois Route 48

Airports and landing strips
 McChristy Airport

Demographics
As of the 2020 census there were 993 people, 397 households, and 231 families residing in the township. The racial makeup of the township was 93.86% White, 0.40% African American, 0.10% Native American, 0.10% Asian, 0.10% Pacific Islander, 0.20% from other races, and 5.24% from two or more races. Hispanic or Latino of any race were 1.21% of the population.

There were 397 households, out of which 18.90% had children under the age of 18 living with them, 41.56% were married couples living together, 8.82% had a female householder with no spouse present, and 41.81% were non-families. 37.30% of all households were made up of individuals, and 18.10% had someone living alone who was 65 years of age or older. The average household size was 2.06 and the average family size was 2.70.

The township's age distribution consisted of 16.5% under the age of 18, 4.3% from 18 to 24, 24.8% from 25 to 44, 29.9% from 45 to 64, and 24.5% who were 65 years of age or older. The median age was 50.6 years. For every 100 females, there were 113.3 males. For every 100 females age 18 and over, there were 115.1 males.

The median income for a household in the township was $54,911, and the median income for a family was $66,563. Males had a median income of $50,179 versus $35,625 for females. The per capita income for the township was $30,058. About 17.3% of families and 12.8% of the population were below the poverty line, including 16.3% of those under age 18 and 14.4% of those age 65 or over.

School districts
 Meridian Community Unit School District 15
 Taylorville Community Unit School District 3

Political districts
 State House District 87
 State Senate District 44

References
 
 United States Census Bureau 2009 TIGER/Line Shapefiles
 United States National Atlas

External links
 City-Data.com
 Illinois State Archives
 Township Officials of Illinois

Townships in Christian County, Illinois
Townships in Illinois